Skyscraper – Original Motion Picture Soundtrack is the film score to the 2018 film of the same name, written and composed by Steve Jablonsky. The score was recorded at Abbey Road Studios in London with an orchestra conducted by Alastair King. Additional mixing was done at Arata Music Studios. The soundtrack was digitally released on July 13, 2018 by Milan Records with the physical soundtrack being released later on August 3, 2018.

Background
Steve Jablonsky was hired to score the film, replacing Thurber's frequent composer, Theodore Shapiro.

For the basis of the score, Jablonsky worked with traditional orchestra and blended looped guitar riffs which consisted of both acoustic and electric. He did this to make the film more realistic and gritty, avoiding the notion of a hero-esque theme. As for the character of Botha, Jablonsky discarded the use of an orchestra to represent the villain. So, he came up with a "unique percussion rhythm" by recording "tom-toms through several distortion pedals and a compressor." which Thurber liked a lot.

Luke Richards, Christian Wibe and Bryce Jacobs provided additional music.

Track listing

Track 18, Walls by Jamie N Commons, is played during the end credits of the film. A further track from the end credits, Break in the Clouds by Frightened Rabbit, is not included in the soundtrack album.

Personnel
 Original Score Composed & Produced- Steve Jablonsky
 Music Supervisors — Peter Afterman & Magaret Yen
 Associate Music Supervisor — Alison Litton
 Music Coordinator — Oriana Pedone
 Mixing Engineer — Jeff Biggers
 Recording Engineer — Andrew Dudman
 Orchestra Leader — Everton Nelson
 Solo Cello — Tim Gill
 Guitars — Tom Strahle, Steve Jablonsky & Bryce Jacobs
 Drums — Jon Jablonsky
 Technical Score Engineer — Lori Castro
 Orchestra Conducted - Alastair King
 Orchestrators — Larry Rench & Jeremy Borum
 Librarian — Jill Streater
 Assistant Engineers — Matt Jones & George Oulton

References

External links
 
 Skyscraper on Milan Records

2018 soundtrack albums
Milan Records soundtracks
Action film soundtracks